Inna Moiseeva (Moisseyeva, ; born 17 February 1971) is a Russian rower.

Biography
Inna Moiseeva was born on 17 February 1971 in Moscow. She graduated from Moscow State Academy of Physical Culture.

Member of the Russian team in rowing since 1992. Member of three world championships. In 1998 she became the vice-champion in the race of fours without the helmsman. Prizewinner of the World Cup stages.

Lives in Moscow.

References

External links
 

1971 births
Living people
Russian female rowers
Rowers from Moscow
World Rowing Championships medalists for Russia